Sea worm may refer to one or several of the following phyla:

See also
 Marine worm

Marine animals